"Trying to Find Atlantis" is a song written by Chris Waters and Zack Turner, and recorded by Australian country music artist Jamie O'Neal.  It was released in September 2004 as the lead single from her second studio album, Brave, and her first single for Capitol Nashville.

Background
"Trying to Find Atlantis" is an up-tempo country song. The song was one of two songs on her second album that were not written or co-written by O'Neal herself.

Content
The song is an analogy to the ancient mythical city of Atlantis that explains how a woman trying to find a perfect man is like "trying to find Atlantis". The song's chorus explains the message of the song:

It's a mystery like the deep blue sea
You can take it you can leave it but I still believe
So I won't give up and I won't give in
I know I'm gonna find him I just don't know when
A girl trying to find herself the perfect man is like trying to find Atlantis

Music video
A music video for "Trying to Find Atlantis" was filmed after its release, directed by Randee St Nicholas. The video showed O'Neal coming out of the beach, wearing a gold-colored wedding dress. She searches around the area looking for the perfect man for her, but is initially unsuccessful. At the very end of the video, she is seen back at the beach and finds a man on a surfboard, realizing he is the perfect man for her.

Chart performance
The song was the first single release for O'Neal on Capitol Records.
The single was released in late September 2004, and officially peaked in early 2005. The song reached a peak of number 18 on the Billboard Hot Country Songs chart and number 86 on the Billboard Hot 100, becoming O'Neal's third Top 20 single on the country chart.

References

2004 singles
Jamie O'Neal songs
Music videos directed by Randee St. Nicholas
Songs written by Chris Waters
Song recordings produced by Keith Stegall
Capitol Records Nashville singles
Songs written by Zack Turner
2004 songs